Kostas Hatzis (born 13 August 1936) is a Greek singer-songwriter and musician of Romani origin.

Kostas Hatzis was born in Livadeia, a city in central Greece to a Romani family. Considered a leading composer and a pioneer in the Greek social song, he has popularised the "voice-guitar" style, voicing ballads with social messages.

His grandfather was a popular clarinetist and dulcimer player. Hatzis quickly followed in his grandfather's footsteps. When he was sixteen years old, his father took him to play at weddings, christenings and other events where folk music was requested. After a five-year musical tour of the Greek countryside, he moved to Athens in 1957, began recording in 1961, and became popular in the mid-1960s with the Greek New Wave movement in music.

Hatzis's talent was discovered by the day's great composers like Mikis Theodorakis, Manos Hadjidakis, Mimis Plessas, Stavros Xarchakos, and Yannis Markopoulos, with whom he since has collaborated, performing their songs, incorporating his personal style and particular sensibility to them.

At the end of the 1960s, Hatzis toured the United States to perform concerts for expatriate Greeks. His fame as a singer for peace reached the White House when then-US President Jimmy Carter invited him to meet and be congratulated for his peace work.

Hatzis has sung about love as well as about social issues in duets with singers like Marinella. Hatzis married a German woman and they have a son, Alexandros Hatzis, who also is a singer.

Discography
1964: Yannis Markopoulos – To Koritsi Me To Kordelaki (Collaboration)
1966: O Kostas Hatzis Tragouda Miki Theodoraki
1966: O Kostas Hatzis Pezi Ke Tragouda Mazi Sas
1966: O Kostas Hatzis Tragouda Theodoraki, Hadjidaki, Markopoulo
1968: Kostas Hatzis – Anagennisis Alonnisos
1969: Kostas Hatzis – Stis Gitonies Tou Kosmou
1970: O Kostas Hatzis Tragouda Kosta Hatzi
1971: Ena Karavi Gemato Tragoudia (Collaboration)
1972: Mia vradia Stou Kosta Hatzi
1972: Kostas Hatzis – Petra Ke Fos
1973: Kostas Hatzis – Ouai
1975: Kostas Hatzis – Dekatria Tragoudia
1975: Kostas Hatzis – O Yios Tis Anixis
1976: Kostas Hatzis – Anthropina Systimata
1976: Marinella & Kostas Hatzis - Recital
1977: Elpida – Dakis Stou Kosta Hatzi
1979: 18 Chronia Kostas Hatzis – Thymithite Mazi Mou (Compilation)
1980: Kostas Hatzis – Portraito (Compilation)
1980: Marinella & Kostas Hatzis - To Tam-Tam
1982: Kostas Hatzis – Ntaoulierika
1983: Kostas Hatzis – Ta Stigmata Tou Kerou
1984: O Kostas Hatzis Zontana Ston Orfea
1985: Marinella – I Agapi Mas (Collaboration)
1987: Marinella & Kostas Hatzis - Synantisi
1989: Kostas Hatzis – '89
1990: Kostas Hatzis – Se 4/4
1990: Kostas Hatzis – Mousiki Ierosylia
1990: Kostas Hatzis – Rom Agapi Mou
1991: I Alexiou Tragoudaei Hatzi
1991: Kostas Hatzis – Ora Miden (4 Tragoudia Gia Tin Eirini)
1994: O Alexandros Tragouda Kosta Hatzi
1995: 30 Chronia Kostas Hatzis Vol. I & II
1995: Kostas Hatzis – Tragoudia Gia Filous
1995: Kostas Hatzis – Ta Prota mou Tragoudia
1996: Kostas Hatzis – Ikones Tou Simera
1996: Kostas Hatzis – Mia Vradia Ston Topo Pou Gennithika
1997: Marinella & Kostas Hatzis – Resital Gia Dio (Compilation)
1998: Kostas Hatzis – Ta Vradia Pou Onirevonte I Tsiggani
2000: Kostas Hatzis – Choris Esena
2000: Kostas Hatzis – Stigmes Monaxias
2002: Mimis Plessas – Iobilaion (Collaboration)
2004: Antonis Remos – Live (Collaboration)
2005: Kostas Hatzis – Live 1965 – 1979 (Compilation)
2007: Kostas Hatzis – Megales Epitihies (Compilation)
2007: 45 Chronia Kostas Hatzis – Anthologia 1961 – 2006 (Compilation)
2008: Kostas Hatzis
2009: Kostas Hatzis & Julie Massino & Alexandros Hatzis – Antitheseis

References

External links
Biography (in English) by Kostas Hatzis in www.alexandroshatzis.com

1936 births
Living people
20th-century Greek male singers
Greek singer-songwriters
21st-century Greek male singers
Greek Romani people
Greek songwriters
Greek people of Romani descent
Universal Music Greece artists
PolyGram Records (Greece) artists
People from Livadeia